Anh Vu (born 15 March 1986) is a Norwegian singer and actress. She took part in the 2004 Norwegian version of Pop Idol. Since then she has also had a role in the 2005 teen film Tommys Inferno.

She was born and grew up in Stavanger and Sandnes to Vietnamese parents She is a Roman Catholic.

External sources

References 

1986 births
Living people
Actresses of Vietnamese descent
Norwegian film actresses
Norwegian Roman Catholics
Norwegian people of Vietnamese descent
People from Sandnes
Musicians from Stavanger
Actors from Stavanger
Singers of Vietnamese descent
21st-century Norwegian singers
21st-century Norwegian actresses
21st-century Norwegian women singers